John William Lowery (born July 31, 1970), best known by the stage name John 5, is an American guitarist. His stage name was bestowed on him in 1998 when he left David Lee Roth's solo band and joined the rock group Marilyn Manson as their guitarist, taking over for Zim Zum. Still going by the name John 5, Lowery became the guitarist for Rob Zombie in addition to his continued collaborations with musical artists across many genres. In 2022, John 5 left Rob Zombie and became the touring lead guitarist for Mötley Crüe.

He is also a solo artist having recorded ten guitar albums: Vertigo (2004), Songs for Sanity (2005), The Devil Knows My Name (2007), Requiem (2008), The Art of Malice (2010), God Told Me To (2012), Careful With That Axe (2014), Season of the Witch (2017), Invasion (2019), and Sinner (2021).  He also has a remix album, Remixploitation (2009), and live albums It's Alive (2018) and Live Invasion (2020). As a staff writer for Chrysalis Records, he works with artists such as Avril Lavigne, Rob Halford, k.d. lang, Garbage, Meat Loaf, Scorpions, Ozzy Osbourne, Slash, FeFe Dobson, and Steve Perry, and has written and recorded with Southern rock band Lynyrd Skynyrd.

Early life 
Lowery is a native of Grosse Pointe, Michigan. He first started playing guitar at seven after watching Buck Owens and Roy Clark's television show Hee Haw with his dad. Specifically, Lowery recalls seeing a young Jimmy Henley playing banjo that drew his inspiration.

His parents supported his playing as long as it did not interfere with his education. He also took guitar lessons from Detroit guitarist Robert Gillespie who taught him classic blues and rock 'n' roll. They also accompanied him at the adult bars he would play during the evening.

His early musical influences came from the Monkees, Kiss, guitarists Eddie Van Halen, Randy Rhoads, Jimi Hendrix, Yngwie Malmsteen, and country music.

Career

1987–1995: Early career 
Lowery started his career as a session guitarist having moved to Los Angeles from Michigan at age 17. His first band in L.A. was Alligator Soup, which led to an important meeting with Rudy Sarzo from Whitesnake who recruited Lowery for his band Sun King giving him his first real bit of exposure. This also saw him meeting producer Bob Marlette, who has worked with, among others, Tracy Chapman, Alice Cooper, Rob Halford and Black Sabbath.

Lowery began working on numerous projects with Marlette including television show soundtracks, movie soundtracks including Speed 2: Cruise Control, and commercials and infomercials. This in turn saw Lowery being picked to play with Lita Ford, opening up for Kiss. He started another long time friendship with the various Kiss members, including a close friendship with Paul Stanley which resulted in his guesting on Stanley's Live to Win album.

Lowery's next role saw him working with Randy Castillo, in the short-lived projects Bone Angels and Red Square Black, who issued the Square EP via Zoo/BMG. The band disbanded when Lowery was picked to play with k.d. lang on tour.

1996–1998: 2wo 

In 1996, Lowery heard that Marilyn Manson was looking for a guitarist and attempted to cold-call the studio Manson was working with to request an audition, but was hung up on, as the guitarist role had already been given to Zim Zum. Lowery teamed up with then-former Judas Priest frontman Rob Halford, along with Sid Riggs (drums) James Wooley (keyboards), and Ray Riendeau (bass) to work on an industrial metal-inspired album, under the band name of 2wo (Two). The subsequent album (Voyeurs) was remixed by Trent Reznor (Nine Inch Nails) and was released on Reznor's Nothing Records label, under the parent company Interscope Records (Universal). The album was not a commercial hit but did produce one video, made by director Chi Chi Larue, for the first single "I am a Pig". It featured some S&M scenes and so was not widely broadcast, but the video was not banned as has been previously rumored. The band embarked on a world tour and were part of the Ozzfest lineup, but the tour was pulled and 2wo disbanded.

1998–2003: David Lee Roth 

Arguably, John 5's first truly "big break" came when he was selected by former Van Halen frontman David Lee Roth to play lead guitar on the critically well-received 1998 release DLR Band.

Regarding how he came to meet Roth, in Guitarist Magazine, Lowery relates that, "when I was little, my dream was to play with David Lee Roth. One day I was sitting at my friend's house and... I wonder[ed] what... Roth is doing now. [In 1997, Roth had just been let go from Van Halen for a second time in favor of Gary Cherone, and also penned a tongue-in-cheek memoir.]. I'm gonna call up his manager and see if he needs any songs."

John 5 submitted six tracks that he had written to Roth's management. Having been a longtime fan of David Lee Roth's work, both in Van Halen and as a solo artist, Lowery believed that he knew exactly what Roth would like. On hearing Lowery's songs, Roth was very impressed and subsequently asked for Lowery to submit several more songs. At the time, Roth was choosing between Lowery and Mike Hartman as to who would play lead guitar. (Lowery would also play bass on the album under the moniker, "B'urbon Bob".) Hartman would die a short time later in 2000 of Cystic Fibrosis.

Impressed by John 5's prodigious skill, Roth scheduled a meeting and then scheduled a recording session that lasted two weeks and resulted in the fourteen track DLR Band album. "I remember before we started, he [David Lee Roth] said, 'If you can't do it in two takes, you can't do it.'"

In 2003, while still lead guitarist for Marilyn Manson, Lowery (then called John 5) was invited by David Lee Roth to write and record the single non-cover song for Roth's 2003 album Diamond Dave.

1998–2004: Marilyn Manson 

After the recording of Mechanical Animals, Marilyn Manson was again looking for a guitarist to replace Zim Zum who had been dismissed from the band during the recording process. Again John went to try out for the band. Following a tour with Rob Halford in Europe, John received a call from Manson's manager asking if he would like to meet Manson for lunch. At the meeting Manson asked John to join the band. Lowery accepted and Manson gave him the name "John 5". As Lowery put it, "right then and there. It was obviously something he'd been thinking about.". 5 signed on for the Mechanical Animals tour and to work on the next album. His first live performance for Marilyn Manson came on the MTV Video Music Awards.

During the opening bars of "The Beautiful People" at the 2003 Rock Am Ring festival Manson was moving across the stage when he hit Lowery's guitar and chest with his boot. Lowery was outraged and threw his guitar while screaming at Manson, which led to much speculation. According to Lowery, the Grotesk Burlesk tour had been a high-pressure endeavor, and just weeks before he had suffered losses of very close family members. Lowery later commented on his behavior, calling it unprofessional and stating that there was no bad blood between Manson and him.

During this time period, Lowery also worked on a band called Plague with Jason Lowetz as the frontman. The album was produced with Bob Marlette but never made it out of the studio. Lowery was considered for the job as frontman for Velvet Revolver before Scott Weiland took it on.

In 2004, Lowery and Manson parted company. Confusion was rife as certain press reported that he had been dumped unceremoniously from the band, but in reality the two came to a mutual agreement that they wanted to go their separate ways. "What actually happened was, at the end of the tour, we were just on different roads. It was completely amicable. He just wanted to write with other members of the band, and I wanted to do other things." While working with Manson, Lowery stated that Manson may have harbored resentment toward him since he does not do drugs or drink alcohol, whereas Manson "is not like that." However, Lowery claims Manson never stated this explicitly to him, and remains unclear on why or whether Manson has ill will toward him.

2005–2006: Loser 

In 2005, Lowery formed the band Loser. Recruiting vocalist Joe Grah, Charles Lee on bass, and Glendon Crain on drums, they began working on their debut album Just Like You. The band was also partly co-founded by friend and producer Bob Marlette. Vocalist Joe Grah already had a significant amount of success in his home state of Texas, with the band Jibe. Marlette recommended Grah to Lowery, and so Lowery hopped on a plane to Texas to see the band play. Grah flew back to L.A. and was hired on the spot.

The name Loser came about as an affirmation to Lowery's past:
"I was from Grosse Pointe, Michigan, which is kind of an upper-class area, and I was always that rock kid," John explained. "I started playing guitar at age 7. I always had a rock shirt on, and I had that tattoo early on. I looked like a loser because everyone around me was wearing Polo and Brooks Brothers. But now if you go into a club wearing Polo, you're called a loser. So I think everyone can relate to that name, and the album title, Just Like You, sums it up."

The band had initial success not long after signing with Island Records, when the track "Disposable Sunshine" became part of the Fantastic Four soundtrack.

During this time, during the recording of the soundtrack, Crain briefly left the band and was replaced by drummer Elias Andra, a friend of Lee's. Andra had some success himself with the band Psycho Plague, his own creation, an industrial metal band, which toured as a headline act with Linkin Park as an opening act at the time. However, Andra soon left after promotional shots had been taken, and Crain returned. Andra went on to become the drummer for Julien-K.

At the same time, Lowery was also working for Rob Zombie and a working conflict occurred. As Zombie was also touring, Lowery tried to find a live replacement for him while Loser were touring on conflicting dates. However, even with promo material for the debut album out and a release date in the bag, Island Records did not like the idea of Loser without John and so dropped the band from the label.

"Being the founding member of Loser, my decision to leave was not an easy one", said John 5 in a press release. "I've been juggling two careers both with Loser and Rob Zombie for over one year now. I found it impossible to be in two places at once."

The album has been put on the backburner, and no word on a release date has ever been issued. The official Loser Myspace page has tracks available for download (working on April 11, 2012). The album was never officially released, but promotional copies were distributed to radio stations and music industry insiders, and have become collectors items among fans.

2005–2022: Rob Zombie 

While Lowery was working with Loser, he also began to work with cult rock artist and movie director Rob Zombie. Meeting at the Camp Freddy benefit gig, Lowery and Zombie hit it off immediately and Rob asked Lowery to play with him at Ozzfest 2005.
"I'm totally ecstatic about having the opportunity to play with Rob on Ozzfest! He has been one of my favorite artists for the longest time. I had the opportunity to play with him a few weeks back and never thought that I would have the chance to share the stage with him playing the Zombie songs we all know and love!"

It was reported that Zombie was looking to quit the music industry to concentrate on his movie career until he began to work with Lowery.

"Camp Freddy asked me to do this benefit, just to play one song, at the Arrowhead Pond (in Anaheim, California) for this tsunami relief thing. And John was there, and we played one song, 'Thunderkiss,' and it kicked ass and he's a supercool guy and I was like, 'this is perfect.' John said, 'Do you need a guitar player for Ozzfest?' I said, 'Yes.' He said, 'I wanna do it,' I said, 'Perfect, done.'" -Rob Zombie on John 5

Lowery worked on Rob Zombie's 2006 album Educated Horses, co-writing eight out of eleven tracks with Zombie. When he left Loser, Lowery took up the role of Rob Zombie guitarist as a permanent gig. "Rob is the best I have worked with. He's great. We have a great time on stage together. It has been the single greatest experience I have had working with someone, hands down." John is also the guitarist on Rob's latest albums, Hellbilly Deluxe 2, released February 2, 2010, Venomous Rat Regeneration Vendor, released April 23, 2013, The Electric Warlock Acid Witch Satanic Orgy Celebration Dispenser, released April 29, 2016, and The Lunar Injection Kool Aid Eclipse Conspiracy, released March 12, 2021.

In early 2011, Lowery was joined by fellow ex-Marilyn Manson bandmate, Ginger Fish, as a member of Rob Zombie's band. Zombie/Slipknot drummer Joey Jordison was in Europe with his band Murderdolls, leaving Zombie without a drummer for some shows during the American leg of their tour. Lowery asked Fish to fill in as drummer. In April 2011, Fish was announced as the new and permanent drummer.

In October 2011, Zombie confirmed by his Facebook  account that Lowery would be scoring the soundtrack for Rob Zombie's latest movie, The Lords of Salem. This was also confirmed on the official John 5 website.In May 2021, it was announced that John 5 along with Rob Zombie, Nikki Sixx, and Tommy Clufetos formed a supergroup called L.A. Rats. Their debut track, "I've Been Everywhere", is from the soundtrack to the Liam Neeson film The Ice Road.

 2022-present: Mötley Crüe 

On October 26, 2022, it was announced that Mick Mars would be retiring as a touring guitarist from Mötley Crüe due to ongoing health issues. Rumors had been circulating that John 5 would take over as Mars' replacement, especially since John did not show for a Rob Zombie concert at Aftershock in Sacramento, California. On October 27, Mötley Crüe confirmed that John 5 had taken his place.

 2004–present: Solo career 
Starting in 2004 with Vertigo, Lowery has recorded eight instrumental records. His works have featured many guest players. For example, Songs for Sanity had Albert Lee, and other records have had Steve Vai, Joe Satriani, and Jim Root. In 2009, John released a remix album, Remixploitation. Lowery has also released an instructional DVD entitled The Devil Knows My Name (2007). In July 2009, on his Twitter page, John 5 announced that he is now six tracks into the next solo album. On October 2, 2009, he played with Slash at a tribute to the Mirage Hotel in Las Vegas.

In a Twitter update January 6, 2010, John 5 had this to say about the progress of his upcoming fifth studio album; "Just did all the guitar, bass for my new solo CD, Tommy Clufetos played the drums and killed it!"  and a following Twitter update January 8; "Did the photo shoot for the new record today!", January 18: "Just had Billy sheehan play on the  song (ya dig), this record is going to rule".

In June 2011, John 5 officially closed his MySpace page. John commented on his own website, "There are a number of reasons, mainly the decline of Myspace as a platform to reach you, the fans. ... So today, the steps were taken to close the account at the Myspace page."

He often names his songs after famous murderers, e.g. Ed Gein ("Gein with Envy", Songs for Sanity), Albert Fish ("Werewolf of Westeria", The Devil Knows My Name), or torture devices (see any song from Requiem).

In February 2014, while giving an interview at the Soundwave festival John 5 announced his seventh solo album entitled "Careful with That Axe", which would go on to be released in August of that year.

John 5 released his eighth solo album titled Season of the Witch on March 3, 2017.  He released his first live album, It's Alive, in early 2018 and toured in the early and late months of 2018 in support of it.  John 5 released his ninth solo album entitled "Invasion" on July 31, 2019.  He was on the road in early and late 2019 in support of the "Invasion" album.

In January through March 2020, John 5 and The Creatures opened for Queensrÿche.

John 5 has released his tenth solo album entitled Sinner on October 29, 2021.

 Personal life 
John 5 has been married three times. John 5 married his second wife, pornographic actress Aria Giovanni in 2002, but they divorced in 2006. He then married hair stylist Rita Lowery (nee Aghajani) on June 7, 2009. John 5 has three children: Jeremy and Nicole from his first marriage and step-son Andre who is the son of Rita Lowery. John 5 also has a grandson.

He is an avid Kiss collector, concentrating on merchandise, clothing, and promotional items from 1973 to 1983. His collection is the focus of his knightsinsatanservice Instagram account.

John 5 often performs riffs on his social media accounts featuring at least one of his Sphynx cats.

 Equipment 

During 2005, John 5 used Marshall amplifiers and cabinets, Boss pedals, Fender Telecaster and J5 guitars, and Dean Markley strings. Prior to that, he used Ibanez guitars and was an endorser for that brand.

 Discography 

 Solo 
Albums
2004: Vertigo2005: Songs for Sanity2007: The Devil Knows My Name2008: Requiem2009: Remixploitation (Remix album)
2010: The Art of Malice2012: God Told Me To (CD/DVD)
2014: Careful With That Axe2017: Season of the Witch2018: It's Alive (Live album)
2019: Invasion2020: Live Invasion (Live album)
2021: SinnerDVD
2004: God Is Closed Vol. 1 (2004, bonus disc for Japanese release of Vertigo)
2007: The Devil Knows My Name (instructional DVD)
2008: IMV Behind the Player (instructional DVD)
2008: IMV Behind the Player (instructional DVD with Tommy Clufetos, on which John 5 appears)

Singles
"Welcome to the Jungle" (Guns N' Roses cover – 2006)
"Laurie's Theme" (Halloween II: Original Motion Picture Soundtrack, 2009)
"Beat It" (Michael Jackson cover – 2011)
"Welcome to Violence" (September 27, 2011)
"Noche Acosador" (November 1, 2011)
"The Castle" (December 20, 2011)
"This Is My Rifle" (June 10, 2014)
"Black Grass Plague" (January 1, 2016)
"Behind the Nut Love" (February 1, 2016)
"Making Monsters" (March 1, 2016)
"Now Fear This" (April 1, 2016)
"Here's to the Crazy Ones" (May 1, 2016)
"Enter Sandman" (Metallica cover - October 13, 2017)
"Zoinks!" (January 1, 2019)
"Crank It/ Living With Ghosts" (February 1, 2019)
"I am John 5" (March 1, 2019)
"Midnight Mass" (April 1, 2019)
"I Want It All" (July 31, 2019)
"Que Pasa" (September 17, 2021)
"Land of the Misfit Toys" (November 2, 2021)

 Loser 
AlbumsJust Like You (2006) Unreleased

Singles
"Disposable Sunshine" (Fantastic 4: The Album, 2005)
"Nobody Knows" (2006)
"The First Time" (2006)

 Marilyn Manson 

AlbumsMechanical Animals (1998, credited as live guitarist)The Last Tour on Earth (1999, live album)Holy Wood (In the Shadow of the Valley of Death) (2000)The Golden Age of Grotesque (2003)Lest We Forget: The Best Of (2004, compilation album released after John 5's departure; he is thanked in the album credits)

DVD & VHSGod Is in the TV (1999)Guns, God and Government (2002)Doppelherz (2003, released as a The Golden Age of Grotesque bonus DVD)

 Rob Zombie 
AlbumsEducated Horses (2006)Zombie Live (2007)Hellbilly Deluxe 2 (2010)Venomous Rat Regeneration Vendor (2013)Spookshow International: Live (2015)The Electric Warlock Acid Witch Satanic Orgy Celebration Dispenser (2016)Astro-Creep: 2000 Live (2018)The Lunar Injection Kool Aid Eclipse Conspiracy (2021)

SinglesWar Zone (2008)

DVDOzzy Osbourne's Ozzfest 10th Anniversary (2005)The Zombie Horror Picture Show (2014)

 Miscellaneous work 
Red Square BlackSquare EP (1994)
2woVoyeurs (1998)

David Lee RothDLR Band (1998)Diamond Dave (2003, co-wrote "Thug Pop")

Paul StanleyLive to Win (2006, co-wrote "Where Angels Dare")

Alice CooperWelcome 2 My Nightmare (2011, featured on "Disco Bloodbath Boogie Fever")

Sebastian BachKicking & Screaming (2011, co-wrote and played on "TunnelVision")Give 'Em Hell (2014, co-wrote and played on "Temptation")

AdlerBack from the Dead (2012, featured on "Good to be Bad")

Beware of DarknessOrthodox (2013, co-wrote "All Who Remain")

Ace FrehleyOrigins, Vol. 1 (2016, played on "Spanish Castle Magic" and "Parasite")Origins, Vol. 2 (2020, played on "I'm Down" and "Politician")

Steve PerryTraces (2018, co-wrote and played on "Sun Shines Gray")

 Films 31 (film) (2016, composer)The Lords of Salem (film) (2012, composer)

 Credits 
Dirty Trixx – 1983 – Guitarist, playing Van Halen covers in local Michigan bars
Raven Payne – 1987 – Guitarist, at 16 years old
John Wetton (of Asia) – John's first paid professional session. "It's one of the hardest I've ever done" states John 5.
Robin Zander (Cheap Trick singer) – Guitarist, recorded demos
 Pepperland – Guitarist, ghost player
Wilson Phillips – Guitarist, ghost player
Salt-N-Pepa – Live Performances including the Jay Leno Show (April 14, 1995)
Rick Springfield – Guitarist, The Day After Yesterday, Tracks 4 and 14
Night Ranger – Guitarist, ghost player
Red Square Black – 1994 – Square EP, Lead Guitar
Lita Ford – 1994–95 – Guitarist, ghost player
Ryan Downe – 1996 – Guitar on track "Japan" of The Hypocrite Album, plus guitar effects
froSTed – 1996 – Guitarist
Leah Andreone – Former Girlfriend, Veiled, Guitar (1996), I Feel the Earth Move, Guitar (1997), Alchemy, Lap Steel Guitar/Guitar (1998), co-wrote ten tracks
k.d. lang – Guitarist, World Tour 1996, 1997. Onstage 'Live in Sydney' VHS Tape
Various Artists, Speed 2: Cruise Control – 1997 – Guitar and Bass for Soundtrack
2wo – 1998 – Voyeurs album, guitar and bass.
David Lee Roth – 1998, 2003 – Guitarist on DLR Band album, and co-wrote "Thug Pop" on the Diamond Dave (album)
Marilyn Manson – 1998–2004 – Guitarist, where he got the nickname "John 5" .  Manson has claimed the name derives from Lowerys first name with the number 5 noting there was a time he considered naming himself and his bandmates with numbers. This continued the departure from the "pin-up + serial killer" naming scheme.
Garbage – 2003 – Additional guitar on "Never Be Free" b-side, possibly co-written by him as well.
Loser — 2005–2006 – Guitarist and founder member of Loser. The band had a song ("Disposable Sunshine") on the Fantastic Four soundtrack and had recorded their debut album Just Like You, but due to conflicting schedules with Rob Zombie, John left the band and Island Records.
Rob Zombie – 2005 – present – Guitarist, Ozzfest 2005 and albums Educated Horses, Zombie Live, Hellbilly Deluxe 2 and Venomous Rat Regeneration Vendor.
Meat Loaf – 2006 – Guitarist, song recorded and co-wrote with Nikki Sixx. Bat Out of Hell III: The Monster Is Loose.
Paul Stanley – 2006 – Co-writer and guitarist on "Where Angels Dare", a track from the album Live to Win.
Saliva – 2007 – Guitarist, on the song "Black Sheep" from the album Blood Stained Love Story.
Static-X – 2007 – First guitar solo on "Cannibal".
Scorpions – 2007 – Co-writer and guitarist on "Hour 1", a track from the album Humanity: Hour I.
Filter – 2008 – Guitarist, on the album Anthems for the Damned,  co writer on two tracks.
Lynyrd Skynyrd – 2009 – Guitarist – John 5 works with Lynyrd Skynyrd.
Halestorm – 2009 – Writer- Co-wrote the track "What Were You Expecting".
Chuck Mosley – 2009 – Guitar on "The Enabler", a track from the album Will Rap Over Hard Rock for Food.
Escape the Fate – 2010 – Composer – Helped compose Escape the Fate's self-titled album.
Ricky Martin – 2011 – Guitar and arranger on Martin's 2010 album Música + Alma + Sexo.
Hollywood Undead – 2011 – Guitar on "Lights Out" on Hollywood Undeads 2011 album American Tragedy (credited as John Lowery).
Sebastian Bach – 2011 – Guitarist and composer on former Skid Row front man Sebastian Bach's "TunnelVision" song from Kicking & Screaming album.
Alice Cooper – 2011 – Solo Guitar on "Disco Bloodbath Boogie Fever" from  Welcome 2 My NightmareLynyrd Skynyrd – 2012 – Songwriting on Last of a Dyin' BreedSteven Adler – 2012 – Guest guitarist on the single "Good to Be Bad" off the album Back from the Dead.
Rod Stewart – 2013 –  Co-wrote the track "It's Over" from the album TimeHollywood Undead – 2013 Notes from the Underground – guitars on tracks (1,2,4,8)
Sebastian Bach – 2014 – Guitarist and composer on former Skid Row front man Sebastian Bach's "Temptation" song from the album Give 'Em Hell.
Tina Guo – 2015 – Guitar on "Iron Man" from the album Cello Metal (album)
Ace Frehley – 2016 – Rhythm guitarist on "Parasite" and "Spanish Castle Magic" from the album Origins, Vol. 1Steve Perry – 2018 – Guitarist and co-writer on "Sun Shines Gray" from the album TracesMötley Crüe – 2019 – Co-writer on "The Dirt", "Crash and Burn", and "Ride with the Devil" from the album The Dirt Soundtrack''

References

External links 

Official website
Official John 5 Instagram page

Lead guitarists
Living people
People from Grosse Pointe, Michigan
American bluegrass guitarists
American heavy metal guitarists
Marilyn Manson (band) members
White Zombie (band) members
1970 births
Guitarists from Michigan
American male guitarists
Industrial metal musicians